Danderhall is a village in Midlothian, Scotland, just outside Edinburgh but inside the Edinburgh City Bypass.

Overview
The village includes a large amount of council housing — although much of this is now privately owned by the occupiers. Danderhall was formerly a mining village, supplying labour for the nearby coal mines of Edmonstone to the northwest, Sheriffhall to the southeast, Woolmet to the east and Monktonhall beyond that. The latter was the last to remain open, but closed for good in 1998.

Danderhall is made up of 1,200 homes and a small number of shops. Danderhall also includes a library, primary school, two churches (a Church of Scotland and "Calvary Chapel of Edinburgh").

Notable people from Danderhall include: footballer Grant Brebner, now playing in Australia, former Hearts and Motherwell footballer Kevin Twaddle., Commonwealth Gold Medalist and triple World Champion David Peacock (bowls), former International darts player Rab Stewart and darts and autocross champion Blair Hamilton.

Danderhall and District is a Community Council area of Midlothian and is within the civil parish of Newton. In addition to Danderhall village, Danderhall Community Council area also takes in the area of Millerhill, Newton Village, Hilltown and various farms. These are small residential areas and without shops and similar amenities, which are concentrated in nearby Danderhall.

Woolmet House

Woolmet House was a large mansion built for Archibald Napier (1575-1600) around 1590 as a wedding present from his wealthy father Archibald Napier of Merchiston Castle (father of John Napier and of Alexander Napier, Lord Laurieston)). It was demolished in the 1950s due to subsidence caused by Woolmet Colliery. Some carved stones from Woolmet were incorporated into the Castle of Mey around 1990.

All that remains is an ornamental doorway of around 1700, now attached to the modern Miners' Welfare Club.

Woolmet Colliery
The Colliery opened late in Scottish mining history (1898) and closed in 1966. It was operated by the Niddrie and Benhar Coal Company. It employed around 700 men and produced around 200,000 tons of coal per annum, under the control of Sir James Steel.

Edmonstone House
This mansion stood west of Woolmet House, north of Danderhall village. It was certainly extant in 1600 as home to the Edmonstone family. It was remodelled in the 18th century but demolished in the 1950s to avoid tax (the fate of many mansions in the 1950s). An entrance lodge and the base of the mansion still survive.

References

External links

Records and information for the Parish of Newton, Midlothian

Villages in Midlothian
Mining communities in Scotland